Hang Love is the third album by the American hard rock band Burning Brides. It was released on June 19, 2007 independently by the band.

Track listing

Personnel 

 Dimitri Coats - electric guitar, vocals
 Melanie Coats - bass
 Pat Beeman - drums

2007 albums
Burning Brides albums
Albums produced by Dimitri Coats